Out of Gas: The End of the Age of Oil is a 2004 book written by David Goodstein. It describes peak oil and the future of civilization.

Synopsis
The book gives the scientific view that the age of petroleum is coming to an end, and the future is dangerously insecure. Oil demand will shortly exceed the production capacity of even the largest suppliers. The book describes how the world economy is moving towards an uneasy transition. In this book, Goodstein rejected the notion that after peak occurs new alternative sources of energy will be able to fuel industry at the same level. Evidence for imminent decrease in world oil production and consequential economic impact and the viability of alternative sources of energy have been presented in the book.

The book begins by citing the work of M. King Hubbert. Then Goodstein briefly mentions thermodynamics, electromagnetism and geology. He then describes the alternative energy technologies. He opines that the alternative energy technologies will not be effective because of the time it will take to improve them for continuing the present day industry. According to the book, the age of oil is ending. Oil supply will shortly begin to decline, precipitating a global crisis. Even if coal and natural gas are substituted for some of the oil, human civilization will start to run out of fossil fuels by the end of the 21st century. He concludes with the warning: "Civilization as we know it will come to an end sometime in this century unless we can find a way to live without fossil fuels".

Reviews
Paul Raeburn wrote in The New York Times that Goodstein's prediction regarding peak oil and future of civilization is based on an understanding of physics and thermodynamics, and on a simple observation about natural resources. He described Out of Gas: The End of the Age of Oil in The New York Times as "a book that is more powerful for being brief -- takes a detour to explain some of the basics of energy budgets, thermodynamics and entropy, and it does so with the clarity and gentle touch of a master teacher". Raeburn concluded about Goodstein's book:

Publishers Weekly commented on the book: 

Brian Braiker described the book in Newsweek as an "important one" where Goodstein gives the explanation of the science behind his prediction.

References

External links
Publisher's page
Review by Sam Dinkin
Entry in Amazon.com

2004 non-fiction books
2004 in the environment
Peak oil books
W. W. Norton & Company books